Calycoceras is an extinct genus of cephalopods belonging to the subclass Ammonoidea and family Acanthoceratidae that lived during the Cenomanian stage of the Late Cretaceous, 100-94 Mya. Their shells had ornate ribs.

Species
C. algeriense Kennedy & Gale, 2017
C. annulatum Collignon, 1964
C. asiaticum (Jimbo, 1894)
C. a. asiaticum (Jimbo, 1894)
C. a. spinosum (Kossmat,  1897)
C. besairieri Collignon, 1937
C. boreale Kennedy, Cobban & Landman, 1996 
C. dromense (Thomel, 1972)  
C. cenomanense (d’Archiac, 1846) 
C. navicularis Mantell, 1822
C. orientale Matsumoto, Saito & Fukada 
C. paucinodatum (Crick) 
C. tarrantense

Distribution
Calycoceras species may be found in the Cretaceous of Angola, Antarctica, Canada (British Columbia), France, Germany, Japan, Nigeria, Oman, Russia, the United Kingdom, United States (Alaska, Arizona, Kansas, New Mexico, South Dakota, Utah) 

C. asiaticum may be found in the Cenomanian of Canada, Southern  England,  northern  and  southern France,  Spain,  Romania,  Bulgaria,  Tunisia,  Madagascar, south India and Japan.

C. cenomanense may be found in the Cenomanian of United Kingdom, France and Madagascar.

Description
The larger phragmocones may reach  in diameter. Coiling  is  moderately  involute. All ribs show strong subspinose tubercles. C. asiaticum asiaticum and C. asiaticum spinosum are very similar, the latter has much more robust tuberculation.

References

Acanthoceratidae
Ammonitida genera
Cretaceous ammonites
Late Cretaceous ammonites of North America
Late Cretaceous cephalopods of North America
Late Cretaceous animals of Africa
Cenomanian life